José Saez (born 7 May 1982 in Menen, Belgium) is a French football midfielder. He played at Valenciennes for nearly ten years solid and one year at Caen.

References

External links

1982 births<ef
Living people
People from Menen
French footballers
French people of Spanish descent
Lille OSC players
Angers SCO players
Valenciennes FC players
Stade Malherbe Caen players
Ligue 1 players
Ligue 2 players
Association football midfielders